Nationality words link to articles with information on the nation's poetry or literature (for instance, Irish or France).

Events
 The Irish poem-book Leabhar Cloinne Aodha Buidhe is transcribed by Ruairí Ó hUiginn of Sligo at the command of Cormac Ó Neill.
 Possible approximate date of composition of the Thai poem Kamsuan Samut, attributed to Si Prat.

Works published
 Wentworth Dillon, translator, Horace's Art of Poetry, translation from the Latin of Horace's Ars Poetica, including an essay by Edmund Waller
 John Dryden and others, translators, Ovid's Epistles
 Thomas Otway, The Poet's Complaint of his Muse; or, A Satyr Against 
 John Wilmot, Earl of Rochester, Poems on Several Occasions By the Right Honourable The E. of R—, published in London, although the book states it was published in "Antwerpen" (see "Deaths", below) The book includes "The Disappointment" by Aphra Behn.

Births
Death years link to the corresponding "[year] in poetry" article:
 September 22 – Barthold Heinrich Brockes (died 1747), German poet
 Mohammed Awzal (died 1748), Moroccan Berber religious poet
 Bulleh Shah (died 1757), Punjabi Sufi poet, humanist and philosopher

Deaths
Birth years link to the corresponding "[year] in poetry" article:
 July 26 – John Wilmot, 2nd Earl of Rochester (born 1647), English poet, courtier and rake (see "Works", above)
 August 25 – Symeon of Polotsk (born 1629), Belarusian-Russian Baroque poet, dramatist, churchman and enlightener
 September 25 – Samuel Butler (born 1612), English satirical poet
 October 15 – Bedřich Bridel (born 1619), Czech Baroque writer, poet and missionary
 November – Carr Scrope (born 1649), English versifier and courtier
 Approximate date
 François Colletet (born 1628), French poet
 Karacaoğlan (born c.1606), Turkish folk poet and ashik

See also

 Poetry
 17th century in poetry
 17th century in literature
 Restoration literature

Notes

17th-century poetry
Poetry